The Cold War Victory Medal is both an official medal of the U.S. National Guard and an unofficial military medal of the United States. It is awarded by the U.S. states of Louisiana and Texas, and in ribbon form only by the State of Alaska.  In the medal's unofficial capacity it can be purchased, but not worn in uniform.  It may be worn by any member of the United States military, or civilian employees of the federal government, who served in their positions honorably during the years of the Cold War, defined as lasting from September 2, 1945 to December 26, 1991.

Background and history
In accordance with section 1084 of the National Defense Authorization Act for fiscal year 1998, Congress commended the members of the Armed Forces and civilian personnel who contributed to the victory of the Western Alliance in the Cold War, and authorized and instructed the then-Secretary of Defense, William Cohen, to prepare a certificate recognizing the Cold War service of qualifying members of the Armed Forces and civilian personnel of the Department of Defense and other government agencies. The certificate became known as the Cold War Recognition Certificate available by request of the individual by all members of the armed forces and qualified federal government civilian personnel who honorably served the United States anytime during the Cold War, which is defined as September 2, 1945 to December 26, 1991.

In October 2001, Congress passed the National Defense Authorization Act (NDAA) for fiscal year 2002, which is signed into law on December 28, 2001 by President George W. Bush. In the NDAA approved by both houses and signed into law by the president, was a Sense of the Congress resolution that the Secretary of Defense should consider authorizing the issuance of a Campaign medal, to be known as the Cold War Service Medal, to each person who while a member of the Armed Forces served satisfactorily on active duty during the Cold War.  The then-Secretary of Defense, Donald Rumsfeld, did not create such a medal.

The official U.S. Navy web page states: "The Department of Defense will not be creating a Cold War Service medal" and that any commemorative medals made by private vendors are unauthorized on the military uniform. At present the Cold War Victory Medal remains strictly commemorative and is unofficial other than for members of the Louisiana National Guard (medal and ribbon), Texas National Guard (medal and ribbon) and Alaska National Guard (ribbon only) .

The Cold War Victory Medal is also referred to as the Cold War Commemorative Medal, Cold War Service Medal, or simply as the Cold War Medal.  There are no devices or attachments authorized for the Cold War Victory Medal.

Design
The Cold War Victory Medal was designed by Nadine Russell, the Chief of Creative Heraldry at the Army's Institute of Heraldry and the designer of many campaign and service medals, including the Southwest Asia Service Medal, the Armed Forces Service Medal, and the Military Outstanding Volunteer Service Medal.

National Guard awards medal
The National Guard Bureau does not issue nor recognize the Cold War Victory Medal. The medal is worn as a National Guard award and issued by the Louisiana National Guard. The Adjutant General of the State of Louisiana currently authorizes the decoration as the "Louisiana Cold War Victory Medal".  Eligible members, including active duty members, of the Louisiana National Guard are authorized to wear the medal in uniform while in the State of Louisiana and not on federal property in that state (e.g., Fort Polk).

The Alaska National Guard has authorized the Cold War Victory Ribbon as the Alaska Cold War Service Ribbon, and authorized it for wear on the military uniforms for the Alaska Army National Guard, Alaska Air National Guard, the Alaska Naval Militia, and the Alaska State Defense Force.  Wear of the medal form of this award is optional, in that the state does not provide the medal, only the ribbon.  Authorized recipients of the ribbon may purchase and wear the medal (full size or miniature) at their own expense, but consistent when wear of medals is directed, such as the Governor's Annual Dinner.

State defense force award
Several state defense forces have authorized wear of the award for members who meet the requirements. The Alaska State Defense Force, the New Mexico State Guard, and the Texas State Guard have authorized the award for wear on their uniforms.

Various commemorative versions of the medal
The Cold War Victory Medal is also a civilian medal which may be privately purchased but is not distributed by the United States government.  As such, the decoration is not presently authorized for wear on active duty military uniforms.  However, the medal has been officially adopted by the Military Order of Foreign Wars of the United States and is thus frequently worn by U.S. military retirees, veterans and civilians on public holidays, parades and veterans functions.  In this regard, the order of precedence of the Cold War Victory Medal is immediately after the lowest authorized U.S. award.

There are various versions of the medal privately struck by many different vendors.  However, the only version which has been officially adopted by the Military Order of Foreign Wars has been the Cold War Victory Medal designed by Nadine Russell of the Institute of Heraldry. It has also been officially adopted by the American Cold War Veterans organization.
The Germany Defense Veterans of America has also adopted and authorized this medal to all the members of the Germany Defense Veterans of America as this organization's wear of medals on the GDVA uniform.

Bills introduced in Congress to enact authorization to wear medal
Over the years bills have been introduced in five separate Congresses for the authorization of a Cold War Victory Medal or Cold War Service Medal. To date bills have successfully passed both houses but get stripped out in committee. All medal bills have been opposed by the U.S. Department of Defense, as it would overlap with service and campaign medals already issued for the Vietnam War and the Korean War, as well as the costs of issuing millions of medals to eligible veterans. On February 17, 2011, Senator Olympia Snowe (ME) and on May 24, 2011, Representative Steve Israel (NY-2) reintroduced legislation in the Senate and House, respectively, that the Secretary of Defense concerned may issue a service medal, to be known as the `Cold War Service Medal', to Cold War veterans who meet the criteria.

===Bills in the United States Senate===

List of 12 senators who have supported the enactment of the medal

Bills in the U.S. House of Representatives

List of 42 representatives plus 1 delegate to congress who have supported the enactment of the medal

References

External links

 
 American Cold War Veterans (Archived from the original at http://www.AmericanColdWarVets.org, which is no longer active.)
 Cold War Veterans Association (Archived from the original at http://www.coldwarveterans.com, which is no longer active.)
 Germany Defense Veterans of America

Awards and decorations of the National Guard (United States)
Cold War
United States service medals